Runoff is the flow of water across the earth, and is a major component in the hydrological cycle. Runoff that flows over land before reaching a watercourse is referred to as surface runoff or overland flow. Once in a watercourse, runoff is referred to as streamflow, channel runoff, or river runoff.
Urban runoff is surface runoff created by urbanization.

Background

Surface runoff

Urban runoff

Channel runoff

Model

Curve number

References

Hydrology